Karunthel Kannayiram is a 1972 Indian Tamil-language crime film directed by R. Sundaram and produced by Modern Theatres. The film stars Jaishankar and Lakshmi. It was released on 17 May 1972 and failed commercially.

Plot

Cast 
Male cast
 Jaishankar
 Manohar
 V. S. Raghavan
 Thengai Srinivasan
 Moorthy

Female cast
 Lakshmi
 Manorama as a vamp
A. Sakunthala

Production 
Karunthel Kannayiram was directed by R. Sundaram and produced by Modern Theatres. Cinematography was handled by G. R. Nathan, and editing by L. Balu. The producer and screenwriter were not credited; the dialogues were written by Ma. Ra.

Soundtrack 
The soundtrack was composed by Shyam–Philips, with lyrics by Kannadasan. The song "Haha! Poonthamalliyile" belongs to Baila, a Sri Lankan music genre.

Release and reception 
Karunthel Kannayiram was released on 17 May 1972, and failed commercially.

References

External links 
 

1970s Tamil-language films
1972 crime films
Films scored by Shyam (composer)
Indian crime films